This page lists board and card games, wargames, miniatures games, and tabletop role-playing games published in 2012.  For video games, see 2012 in video gaming.

Games released or invented in 2012

Game awards given in 2012
Spiel des Jahres: Kingdom Builder
Kennerspiel des Jahres: Village
Kinderspiel des Jahres: Schnappt Hubi! 
Deutscher Spiele Preis: Village
Games: Tikal II: The Lost Temple
 Keyflower won the Spiel Portugal Jogo do Ano.

Deaths

References

See also
List of game manufacturers
2012 in video gaming

Games
Games by year